Turn It Up is the second studio album by American country music artist Josh Thompson. It was released on April 1, 2014 via Show Dog-Universal Music. The album includes the single "Cold Beer with Your Name on It".

Track listing

Personnel
Adapted from liner notes.

 Richard Bennett - acoustic guitar (tracks 2, 3, 7)
 Perry Coleman - background vocals (track 2)
 Shannon Forrest - drums (all tracks), drum programming (track 1)
 Paul Franklin - steel guitar (track 3)
 Tania Hancheroff - background vocals (track 2)
 Wes Hightower - background vocals (all tracks except 2)
 Steve Hinson - steel guitar (tracks 8, 9)
 Justin Levenson - percussion (tracks 8, 9)
 Mac McAnally - acoustic guitar (tracks 1, 8, 9), mandola (track 8)
 Rob McNelley - electric guitar (all tracks)
 Russ Pahl - steel guitar (track 6)
 Michael Rhodes - bass guitar (tracks 4-6, 10) 
 Jimmie Lee Sloas - bass guitar (tracks 1, 8, 9)
 Bobby Terry - acoustic guitar (tracks 4-6, 10)
 Josh Thompson - lead vocals (all tracks)
 Jimmy Wallace - clavinet (track 2), Hammond B-3 organ (tracks 1-3, 7, 8), keyboards (tracks 4-6, 10), piano (tracks 3, 8), Wurlitzer (tracks 3, 9)
 Glenn Worf - bass guitar (tracks 2, 3, 7)

Chart performance
The album debuted at No. 36 on the Billboard 200 and No. 7 on the Top Country Albums chart, with 9,000 copies sold in its first week in the US.  The album has sold 25,000 copies in the US as of July 2014.

Album

Singles

References

2014 albums
Josh Thompson (singer) albums
Show Dog-Universal Music albums
Albums produced by Mark Wright (record producer)